Alen Mašović (born 7 August 1994) is a Serbian footballer who plays as a forward for Nasaf.

Club career
Born in Novi Pazar, he played in the youth teams of FK Partizan before coming to Borac Čačak .

On 21 July 2015, he signed with Voždovac.

On 4 August 2021, he returned to Voždovac.

References

External links
 
 

 Alen Mašović stats at utakmica.rs 

1994 births
Living people
Sportspeople from Novi Pazar
Association football forwards
Serbian footballers
Serbian expatriate footballers
FK Borac Čačak players
FK Voždovac players
FK Čukarički players
FC Machida Zelvia players
Serbian First League players
Serbian SuperLiga players
J2 League players
Serbian expatriate sportspeople in Japan
Expatriate footballers in Japan